Fontana station may refer to:

 Fontana metro station, a rapid transit station in Barcelona, Catalonia, Spain
 Fontana station (California), a commuter rail station in Fontana, California, USA